Baire Benítez was a Cuban chess player. He won the Cuban Chess Championship in 1921.

References 

Cuban chess players
Year of birth missing
Year of death missing